Akpar Valiyev (born 7 September 2001) is an Azerbaijani footballer who plays as a goalkeeper for Shamakhi in the Azerbaijan Premier League.

Club career
On 21 May 2022, Valiyev made his debut in the Azerbaijan Premier League for Shamakhi match against Zira.

References

External links
 

2001 births
Living people
Association football goalkeepers
Azerbaijan youth international footballers
Azerbaijan under-21 international footballers
Azerbaijani footballers
Azerbaijan Premier League players
Shamakhi FK players